Henry Nyandoro (October 20, 1969 in Kisii – August 28, 1998) was an international Kenyan football midfielder who played for AFC Leopard (1987-1990) and Shabana from 1990 to 1996 in Kisii.

International career
He played 102 international matches for Kenya. He played at the 1992 African Cup of Nations.

Clubs
1988-1990 :  AFC Leopards
1990-1996 :  Shabana Kisii

External links
 THE Kenya national soccer yester

1998 deaths
1969 births
Kenyan footballers
1992 African Cup of Nations players
A.F.C. Leopards players

Association footballers not categorized by position
Kenya international footballers